Tekmen is the name of several places in Turkey:

People
Ece Tekmen (born 2002), Turkish women's footballer

Places
Tekmen, Bozyazı, a town in Bozyazı district of Mersin Province
Tekmen, Osmancık, a village in Osmancık district of Çorum Province